Jinta may refer to:

Jinta County, county in Jiuquan, Gansu, China
Phanuwat Jinta (born 1987), Thai footballer
The name Jinta means "a true friend"